Little Wapwallopen Creek is a tributary of the Susquehanna River in Luzerne County, Pennsylvania, in the United States. The creek is designated as a Coldwater Fishery and a Migratory Fishery and is not considered to be impaired. It has two named tributaries: Pond Creek and Nuangola Outlet. Wild trout naturally reproduce in the creek.

Little Wapwallopen Creek ranges from slightly acidic to slightly basic. It is a significant source of flooding in Conyngham Township, Dorrance Township, and Rice Township. Numerous bridges have been constructed across the creek. The surficial geology in its vicinity consists of alluvium, alluvial terrace, alluvial fan, Wisconsinan Ice-Contact Stratified Drift,  Wisconsinan Till, and wetlands. Numerous bridges have also been constructed across the creek.

Course

Little Wapwallopen Creek begins in Boyle Pond in Rice Township. It flows west for several tenths of a mile and passes through another pond before turning south-southwest for more than a mile (two kilometers). It then turns west for a few tenths of a mile and receives Nuangola Outlet, its first named tributary, from the right. The creek turns south-southwest for more than a mile before turning southwest and crossing Interstate 81 and entering Dorrance Township. Several tenths of a mile further downstream, it passes through Andy Pond and turns west-northwest for a short distance. It then turns west-southwest for considerably more than a mile before turning west and then west-northwest. The creek then turns north for a few tenths of a mile before turning west for several tenths of a mile. For the next few miles, it flows roughly west-southwest, entering Conyngham Township. The creek then turns south for several tenths of a mile, briefly entering Hollenback Township before turning north and flowing alongside Hess Mountain as it reenters Conyngham Township. Its valley broadens and it flows west-southwest for a few miles, receiving the tributary Pond Creek and crossing Pennsylvania Route 239. A short distance further downstream, it reaches its confluence with the Susquehanna River.

It joins the Susquehanna River  upriver of its mouth.

Tributaries
Little Wapwallopen Creek has numerous unnamed tributaries and two named tributaries: Nuangola Outlet and Pond Creek.

Hydrology
The turbidity level of the creek at this location was once measured to be fewer than 5 Jackson Turbidity Units. The creek's pH ranged between a slightly acidic 6.3 and a slightly basic 7.4. The creek is not considered to be impaired as of 2006.

The concentration of dissolved oxygen in the waters of Little Wapwallopen Creek was measured in the 1970s to be .

The concentration of organic nitrogen in Little Wapwallopen Creek was once measured to be  and the ammonia concentration was once measured to be . The concentration of nitrogen in the form of nitrates was measured to be  and the concentration of nitrogen in the form of nitrites was measured to be .

The concentration of dissolved solids in Little Wapwallopen Creek was once measured to be .

At its mouth, the peak annual discharge of Little Wapwallopen Creek has a 10 percent chance of reaching . It has a 2 percent chance of reaching  and a 1 percent chance of reaching . The peak annual discharge has a 0.2 percent chance of reaching . Upstream of the tributary Pond Creek, the peak annual discharge of the creek has a 10 percent chance of reaching . The peak annual discharge has a 0.2 percent chance of reaching .

It has a 2 percent chance of reaching  and a 1 percent chance of reaching . The peak annual discharge has a 0.2 percent chance of reaching . The peak annual discharge has a 0.2 percent chance of reaching .

Geography, geology, and climate

The course of the creek is tortuous.

Numerous deposits of Wisconsinan Ice-Contact Stratified Drift are present as well. Alluvial terrace also occurs near the creek, which is the only place in the quadrangle of Sybertsville that contains it in the surficial geology. Wisconsinan Loess, which consists of windblown silt and fine sand, occurs in the southern part of the creek's valley in the Sybertsville quadrangle. The remains of outwash terraces also occur near the creek in that quadrangle.

In the Sybertsville quadrangle, the surficial geology in the valley of Little Wapwallopen Creek mainly consists of alluvium, alluvial terrace, alluvial fan, Wisconsinan Ice-Contact Stratified Drift, and some small patches of Wisconsinan Till. The surficial geology on the valley slopes and uplands mainly consists of bedrock. In the quadrangle of Freeland, the surficial geology near Little Wapwallopen Creek mainly features Wisconsinan Till, Wisconsinan Ice-Contact Stratified Drift, and alluvium. The surficial geology near the creek in the Wilkes-Barre West quadrangle mainly consists of Wisconsinan Till, with some scattered areas of bedrock and alluvium.

The Berwick Axis, which is also known as the Montour Axis, crosses the Susquehanna River half a mile downstream of the mouth of Little Wapwallopen Creek. There is concealed Marcellus shale near the creek in Hollenback Township.

The water temperature of Little Wapwallopen Creek near Wapwallopen was measured several times during the 1970s.

Watershed

The mouth of the creek is in the United States Geological Survey quadrangle of Berwick. However, its source is in the quadrangle of Wilkes-Barre West. It also flows through the quadrangles of Freeland and Sybertsville. The creek is one of the major streams in Luzerne County.

The land in the 100 year floodplain of Little Wapwallopen Creek mainly consists of agricultural and forested land. However, there are also some areas of rural residential land. A natural gas pipeline  in diameter and owned by the Transcontinental Gas Pipeline Company crosses an unnamed tributary of Little Wapwallopen Creek. Numerous bridges have also been constructed across the creek.

A  lake known as Lilly Lake is in the watershed of Little Wapwallopen Creek, on one of its tributaries. A pond known as Triangle Pond is also in the upper reaches of the watershed. Henry C. Bradsby's book History of Luzerne County, Pennsylvania described Round Pond as being in the watershed as well. A swamp known as Turner Swamp is also in the watershed. Other lakes in the creek's vicinity include Andy Pond, Lake Blytheburn, Boyle Pond, Nuangola Lake, and the Ice Ponds. Many patches of wetlands are found in the watershed's upper reaches.

A package wastewater treatment facility operated by the Crestwood School District discharges into Little Wapwallopen Creek in Rice Township. Another package wastewater treatment facility is operated by Wilbar Realty in the same township and discharges into the creek.

Little Wapwallopen Creek is one of the main sources of flooding in Conyngham Township, along with the Susquehanna River. The creek is also the main source of flooding in Dorrance Township and one of the main sources in Rice Township. A 100 year flood of the creek would flood substantial areas. Such flooding would also be exacerbated by backwater flooding from the Susquehanna River.

History
Little Wapwallopen Creek was entered into the Geographic Names Information System on August 2, 1979. Its identifier in the Geographic Names Information System is 1179707.

Historically, a Native American path went from Council Cup up the Little Wapwallopen Creek valley and to Wilkes-Barre. The path ran from Council Cup to the creek and then northeast alongside it before going past Lily Lake and over Penobscot Mountain towards where Wilkes-Barre is now located. The first person to settle in Conyngham Township was Martin Harter, who settled on the creek near its mouth in 1795.

In the late 1800s, there was an old ferry road near the mouth of Little Wapwallopen Creek. A railroad bridge also crosses the creek. Historically, a road ran from a small settlement on Big Wapwallopen Creek to an even smaller one on Little Wapwallopen Creek, near where Church Road presently is. The Glen Brook Water Company once had plans to construct a dam on the creek and also on its tributary Pond Creek. The Wilkes-Barre Ice Company and the Hazleton Ice Company also dammed a stream in the creek's watershed in 1912 and 1916 respectively, forming the Ice Ponds.

Numerous bridges have been constructed across the creek. A concrete stringer/multi-beam or girder bridge carrying Blytheburn Road was built over Little Wapwallopen Creek in 1920. A concrete slab bridge was built across the creek in 1935 and repaired in 2007. In 1940, a bridge carrying Pennsylvania Route 239 was constructed over the creek in Conyngham Township.

A three-span bridge carrying Interstate 81 northbound over Little Wapwallopen Creek was constructed in Rice Township in 1964 and repaired in 1987. A bridge of the same type was built over the creek for Interstate 81 southbound in 1965. In 1975, a prestressed stringer/multi-beam or girder bridge carrying State Route 3008/Ruckle Hill Road was built over the creek. A prestressed box beam or girders bridge was built in Dorrance Township in 1988. A steel girder and floorbeam system bridge was built over the creek in 1997.

This is the only recorded flooding of a developed area caused by a major storm in the township.

In August 2002, the Pennsylvania Environmental Council received $57,897.76 to carry out a restoration plan on the upper reaches of Little Wapwallopen Creek. Since 2005, a project to remedy streambank erosion on the creek has been successful. The creek has a watershed association known as the Little Wapwallopen Creek Watershed Association.

Biology
The drainage basin of Little Wapwallopen Creek is designated as a Coldwater Fishery and a Migratory Fishery. They also do so in the tributary Pond Creek from its headwaters downstream to its mouth.

Henry C. Bradsby's 1893 book History of Luzerne County, Pennsylvania stated that Long Pond and Round Pond, two ponds in the watershed, had a large fish population. The creek was stocked with 700 fingerling, yearling, and adult brook trout in 1909.

The greenway of Little Wapwallopen Creek has been proposed as a conservation area in the Open Space, Greenways & Outdoor Recreation Master Plan for Luzerne County and Lackawanna County.

See also
 Rocky Run (Susquehanna River), next tributary of the Susquehanna River going upriver
 Big Wapwallopen Creek, next tributary of the Susquehanna River going downriver
 List of rivers of Pennsylvania

References

External links
 Image of Little Wapwallopen Creek
 Another image of the creek

Rivers of Luzerne County, Pennsylvania
Tributaries of the Susquehanna River
Rivers of Pennsylvania